The 1962 Milan–San Remo was the 53rd edition of the Milan–San Remo cycle race and was held on 19 March 1962. The race started in Milan and finished in San Remo. The race was won by Emile Daems.

General classification

References

1962
1962 in road cycling
1962 in Italian sport
1962 Super Prestige Pernod
March 1962 sports events in Europe